This is a list of the first minority male lawyer(s) and judge(s) in Montana. It includes the year in which the men were admitted to practice law (in parentheses). Also included are men who achieved other distinctions, such becoming the first in their state to graduate from law school or become a political figure.

Firsts in Montana's history

Lawyers 

 First African American male: John D. Posten (1890) 
 First Native American (Métis) male: Raymond Francis Gray (1946)

State judges 

 First Native American male: Ira Left Hand, Sr.  
 First openly gay male: Shane Vannatta in 2019

Federal judges 
 First African American male (U.S. Commissioner for the United States District Court of Montana): John D. Posten (1890) in 1893

Montana State Bar Association 

 First openly gay male (president): Shane Vannatta in 2011

Firsts in local history 
 James Weston Dorsey (1927): First black male to graaduate from the University of Montana School of Law [Missoula County, Montana]

See also 
 List of first minority male lawyers and judges in the United States

Other topics of interest 

 List of first women lawyers and judges in the United States
 List of first women lawyers and judges in Montana

References 

 
Minority, Montana, first
Minority, Montana, first
first minority male lawyers and judges
History of Montana
Montana lawyers